George Clark may refer to:

Politicians

Sir George Clark, 1st Baronet (1861–1935), businessman and politician in Northern Ireland
Sir George Clark, 2nd Baronet (1883–1950)
Sir George Clark, 3rd Baronet (1914–1991), unionist politician and Orangeman
George Clark (New Orleans), mayor of New Orleans, 1866
George Clark (Queensland politician) (1834–1907), Member of the Legislative Assembly of Queensland for Warwick 
George Daniel Clark (1848–1933), Australian politician
George T. Clark (1837–1888), American politician
George Washington Clark (1834–1898), mayor of Charleston, South Carolina

Sportsmen
George Clark (baseball) (1891–1940), baseball player 
George Clark (American football coach) (1894–1972), "Potsy", American football coach
George Clark (cricketer), New Zealand cricketer
George Clark (racing driver) (1890–1978), American racecar driver
George Clark (Australian footballer) (1898–1978), Australian footballer

Academics
George Bassett Clark (1827–1891), American instrument maker and astronomer
George Clark (historian) (1890–1979), British historian
George W. Clark, American astronomer

Others
George Rogers Clark (1752–1818), American Revolutionary War military leader
George Ramsey Clark (1857–1945), Rear Admiral, United States Navy
George Rife Clark (cartoonist) (1902–1981), creator of The Neighbors
George Kitson Clark (1900–1975), English historian
George H. Clark (1872–1943), Republican lawyer and judge from Ohio
George M. Clark (1875–1951), American jurist
G. T. Clark (George Thomas Clark, 1809–1898), British engineer and antiquary
George Clark (activist) (born 1926) a founding member of the 'Committee of 100' and housing activist in Notting Hill
George Clark (producer) (1888–1946), British film producer
George Aitken Clark (1823–1873), Scottish manufacturer and benefactor
George Clark (British Army officer)  (1892–1948), senior British Army officer 
George Makana Clark, Zimbabwean writer
George Clark (journalist) (1918–2006), British naval officer and The Times journalist.
George Clark (artist), contemporary moving image artist based in London, UK

See also
George Clarke (disambiguation)
George Clerk (disambiguation)